Assebroek is a suburb in the municipality and city of Bruges, Belgium. In 2004, Assebroek had 19,525 inhabitants. Since 1999, this number has hardly changed. Assebroek is home to 16.7% of Bruges’ population.

History

Through artifacts retrieved near Saint-Lucas hospital (and stored at Gruuthusemuseum in Bruges) we assume that the Leitje region was already inhabited in the Stone Age.

Aerial views of the Ver-Assebroekse meersen reveals an approximately 300 m-wide ring of ditches and rampart complex dating from the 5th century where the lords of Assebroek later built their castle.

Apparently around the 12th century, a lord called Boudewijn of Assebroek bought his domain – limited by Oostkamp, Oedelem, Michel van Hamme street, Astridlaan and Lorreinendreef - free from Sijsele.

The Assebroek municipality only consisted of some scattered maisonnettes and a mill along the old road to Ghent. Instigated by the lords of Assebroek, a local church and Engelendale convent were established.

Nowadays Assebroek includes 6 parishes: Immaculata (Ver-Assebroek), Assumpta, Saint Lutgardis, Saint Catharina, Saint Christopher, and Sacred Heart (Steenbrugge).

Etymology

Before the 20th Century, the town's name was recorded as Ars(e)brouc, later becoming Assebroek.

Ars(e)brouc probably meant wetland with horses. The medieval Dutch Arse or Ors being horses and brouc meaning marsh. In medieval times, the Meersen area was surrounded by several inns all bearing horsenames of which only the ruin of The Flying Horse in Oedelem is still standing. Some sources claim Arse stands for ashes so that Assebroek would mean marsh surrounded by ashes.

Geography

Assebroek is situated on a lower sand plain south west of Bruges. Forming a typical polder landscape, in winter an area called Assebroekse Meersen, characterised by small grass fields separated by willow trees often gets flooded.

The Meersen area arose as prolongation within the so-called Flemish Valley. The slope contains sand, lime and peat deposits from the Holocene Epoch. Underneath the peat remains an approx. 30 cm marsh lime layer from the early Holocene. 10,000 years ago, this region was a real marsh.

Evolution of the number of inhabitants

19th century
Census results of December 31

20th century till rearrangement of municipalities
Census results of December 31

Curiosities

 Local church of Ver-Assebroek with organ (Pastoor Verhaegheplein)
 Reserve 4.2 km² "Assebroekse Meersen" with concentric rings (Kerkdreef)
 19th century village centre (Generaal Lemanlaan)
 Cemetery of Bruges – a.o. tomb of Guido Gezelle (Kerkhofblommenstraat)
 Bergjesbos (Olmendreef)
 Former inn "The Lily" (Weidestraat)
 Children's farm "The Seven Towers" (Canadaring) (NL = Zeven Torentjes)
 Old barn "Het Leenhof" (Kerklaan)
 Convent domain "Engelendale" (Astridlaan)
 Abbey farm "Saint-Trudo" (Sint-Trudostraat)
 Reserve 400,000 m² "Gemene Weidebeek" (Gemene Weideweg)
 Kasteel Zevecote (Bossuytlaan)

Assebroek - a sacred place

Each year thousands of pilgrims honour the miraculous figurine of The Madonna at Ver-Assebroek. According to the legend (represented by the stained-glass windows in the church) this marble figurine floated when the Geuzen threw it into the sea. Some also consult the monks of Steenbrugge.

Assebroek beer community

In medieval times, the inner city of Bruges imposed significant taxes on beer consumption. Hence so called outside drinkers found their way to Assebroek's inns till the early morning when Bruges’ city gates were opened.

Many beers are named after this place (Steenbrugge Blonde, Steenbrugge Double Brown, Steenbrugge Triple and Steenbrugge White) or were locally brewed by the Regenboog Brewery (now moved to Mater).

Gallery

External links
 Department Monuments & Landscapes
 www.brugge.be

Biking and strolling
 Meersen strollersroute

Sub-municipalities of Bruges
Populated places in West Flanders